My Love Emotion is the seventh studio album of Filipino singer-actress Regine Velasquez. It was released on 1995 in the Philippines under Polycosmic Records, distributed by Mercury Records and also in other part of Asia like Hong Kong, Japan, China, Taiwan, Indonesia and Thailand under PolyGram Records. Southern Sonss frontman, Phil Buckle, saw Velasquez in one of her performances in Singapore and later offered to collaborate with her, writing the title track for the album. The album made a combined regional and domestic sales of 250,000 copies, although it did not achieve the commercial and critical heights of its predecessor Listen Without Prejudice (1994).

Track listing 
My Love Emotion – Standard edition. Credits are adapted from the liner notes.
'''

Certifications

Release history

See also 
Regine Velasquez discography
List of best-selling albums in the Philippines

References 

Regine Velasquez albums
PolyGram albums
1995 albums